Tommaso Costa (1634–1690) was an Italian painter of the Baroque period. He was born in Sassuolo, and died in Reggio Emilia. He was the pupil of the painter Jean Boulanger at Modena. He painted the cupola of the church of San Vicenzo in Modena and affreschi in the pilgrimage church of Fiorano Modenese, south of Modena.

References

1634 births
1690 deaths
17th-century Italian painters
Italian male painters
Italian Baroque painters
People from Sassuolo